The 2022–23 Primera Federación season is the second for the Primera Federación, the new third highest level in the Spanish football league system. Forty teams will participate, divided into two groups of twenty clubs each based on geographical proximity. In each group, the champions automatically promoted to Segunda División and the second to fifth placers will play promotion play-offs and the bottom five are relegated to the Segunda Federación.

Overview before the season
A total of 40 teams will join the league, including four relegated from the 2021–22 Segunda División, 26 retained from the 2021–22 Primera División RFEF, and 10 promoted from the 2021–22 Segunda División RFEF.

Team changes

Groups

Group 1

Teams and locations

Personnel and sponsorship

League table

Results

Group 2

Teams and locations

Personnel and sponsorship

League table

Results

See also
2022–23 La Liga
2022–23 Segunda División
2022–23 Segunda Federación
2022–23 Tercera Federación

References

 
Spain
Primera Federación seasons